Edwin Cyril "Ed" Johnson (March 31, 1899 – July 3, 1975) was an American Major League Baseball right fielder who played for the Washington Senators in .

External links

1899 births
1975 deaths
Baseball players from Kentucky
Major League Baseball right fielders
People from Morganfield, Kentucky
Washington Senators (1901–1960) players